Pipariya railway station  is a railway station serving Pipariya town, in Narmadapuram district of Madhya Pradesh State of India. Pipariya is A category station of West Central Railway Zone of Indian Railways. It is under Jabalpur railway division of West Central Railway Zone of Indian Railways. It is located on Itarsi - Jabalpur main line of the Indian Railways. 

It is located at 339 m above sea level and has three platforms. As of 2016, electrified of existing double Broad Gauge railway line is in progress and at this station, 108 trains stops. Bhopal Airport, is at distance of 126 kilometers .

It is nearest railway station Pachmarhi station Pachmarhi sanctuary of Satpura National Park . 

Tigers are slowly disappearing from our forests. In Satpura tiger reserve, significant increase in the population of tiger has been noticed.

References

Jabalpur railway division
Railway stations in Hoshangabad district